Estigmene internigralis is a moth of the family Erebidae. It was described by George Hampson in 1905. It is found in Angola and South Africa.

References

 

Spilosomina
Moths described in 1905